SomiSomi Soft Serve & Taiyaki is an American chain of independently owned and operated franchised stores based in Los Angeles, California. They primarily serve Korean Bungeo-ppang (fish-shaped pastry) paired with soft serve, known together as ah-boong.

History
SomiSomi was founded in 2016 by Matt Kim in the Koreatown neighborhood of Los Angeles, California The location quickly gained popularity and built a cult-like following, resulting in a fast expansion across Southern California.

In October 2018, SomiSomi opened their first location outside of California in Honolulu,  Hawaii.

In July 2019, SomiSomi began expanding into Texas. opening a location in Katy. They would later open locations in Frisco, Carrollton, and Sugar Land.

In June 2020, SomiSomi opened their first Nevada location in Las Vegas.

References

External links
 

Restaurants established in 2016
Companies based in Los Angeles
Fast-food chains of the United States
2016 establishments in California
Koreatown, Los Angeles